Robert Massin (13 October 1925 – 8 February 2020) was a French graphic designer, art director and typographer, notable for his innovative experimentation with expressive forms of typographic composition. Massin stopped using his first name in the 1950s.

Biography

Massin was born in 1925 in Bourdinière-Saint-Loup, a commune in the Eure-et-Loir department in north-central France. He began working as a designer following World War II. Massin's immediate influence in the 1950s was innovative French book designer Pierre Faucheux. Faucheux emphasized the idea that each new book should be a new object determined by type choice, proportion and déroulement, the development of a visual concept over several pages. Faucheux also emphasized the idea that the choice of typeface should have some relationship to the meaning of the text. These ideas are apparent in much of Massin's most famous work.

For over twenty years Massin acted as art director of Éditions Gallimard, one of the leading French publishers of books. An early, important work for Massin at Gallimard was his 1963 design for Raymond Queneau's Exercices de style, a book of 99 retellings of the same story, each presented different graphically. Another famous design appeared in 1964 in Massin's graphic interpretation of Eugène Ionesco's play, La Cantatrice chauve (translated as The Bald Prima Donna or The Bald Soprano). The book was a major work of expressive typography, presenting the dialogue of a single play through hundreds of pages of innovative graphic compositions. Massin not only used mixtures of typefaces and new compositional methods to present dialogue, he also formally manipulated dialogue by stretching and bending.

In addition to a large body of visual work, Massin also wrote several books including La Lettre et l'Image (Letter and Image). (His entry in the French Wikipedia presents a more thorough bibliography.) Writing in Eye magazine in a review of a book on Massin, Jan Middendorp credited La Cantatrice and La Lettre et l'Image as follows: "These two masterpieces of typographic eccentricity became hot items among designers and art directors on both sides of the Atlantic, and were especially influential in America, where they helped trigger the post-functionalist approach of graphic design that eventually culminated in the eclecticism of the late 1980s and 1990s." 

A 2007 major monograph of his work, Massin, written by Laetitia Wolff and published by Phaidon, was the first Massin monograph to appear in English.  Massin died in Paris on February 8, 2020.

Work

Notable books designed by Massin:
 Exercices de style, by Raymond Queneau, Gallimard, 1963.
 La Cantatrice chauve, by Eugène Ionesco, Gallimard, 1964.
 Délire à deux, by Eugène Ionesco, Gallimard, 1966.
 Conversation-sinfonietta, by Jean Tardieu, Gallimard, 1966.
 Les Mariés de la tour Eiffel, by Jean Cocteau, Hoëbeke, begun in 1966 and published in 1994.

Notable books written by Massin:
 La Lettre et l'Image, Gallimard, 1970.

References

 Hollis, Richard, Massin: Language Unleashed. Eye, No. 16, Vol. 4, edited by Rick Poynor, Emap Construct, London, Spring 1995.
 Heller, Steven, Massin's Typographic Voices. Baseline 37, edited by Mike Daines & Hans Dieter Reichert, Bradbourne Publishing, 2002
 Middendorp, Jan, The Man on Every French Bookshelf. Eye, No. 65, Vol. 17, edited by John L. Walters, Haymarket, London, Autumn 2007. 
 Wolff, Laetitia, Massin, Phaidon, 2007. 

1925 births
2020 deaths
French graphic designers
People from Eure-et-Loir